Kanikurgan is a rural locality (a selo) in Grodekovsky Selsoviet of Blagoveshchensky District, Amur Oblast, Russia. The population was 233 as of 2018. There are 4 streets.

Geography 
Kanikurgan is located on the left bank of the Amur River, 25 km southeast of Blagoveshchensk (the district's administrative centre) by road. Zarechny is the nearest rural locality.

References 

Rural localities in Blagoveshchensky District, Amur Oblast